The Victoriaville Tigres are a junior ice hockey team that plays in the Quebec Major Junior Hockey League. The team is based in Victoriaville, Quebec, Canada. The team plays its home games at the Colisée Desjardins.

History
The franchise was granted for the 1982–83 season in Longueuil, Quebec, where they were known as the Longueuil Chevaliers. In 1987, the team moved to Victoriaville by owner, Gilles Lupien. The Tigres won the President's Cup in 2002 and 2021 and went to the 2002 Memorial Cup finals, which they lost to the Kootenay Ice.

NHL alumni
List of Victoriaville Tigres who have played in the National Hockey League.

Yearly results
OL = Overtime loss, SL = Shootout loss, Pct = Winning percentage

References

External links
 Official site
 QMJHL arena guide profile

1982 establishments in Quebec
Ice hockey teams in Quebec
Quebec Major Junior Hockey League teams
Sport in Victoriaville
Ice hockey clubs established in 1982